Andelfingen District is one of the twelve districts of the German-speaking canton of Zurich, Switzerland.

It corresponds to the Zürcher Weinland, bounded by the Rhine to the north and west, by the canton of Thurgau to the east, by Winterthur to the south and by the Irchel to the southwest.

Municipalities 
Andelfingen contains a total of twenty municipalities:

Mergers 
1872: Secession from Adlikon → Humlikon
1878: Renaming of Dorlikon → Thalheim an der Thur
1879: Secession from Trüllikon → Truttikon
1970: Renaming of Grossandelfingen → Andelfingen
2013: Merger between „Obere Hueb“ from the Municipality of Buch am Irchel → Neftenbach
2019: Merger between Oberstammheim, Unterstammheim and Waltalingen → Stammheim
2023: Merger between Adlikon and Humlikon → Andelfingen

See also
Municipalities of the canton of Zürich

References

Districts of the canton of Zürich